Stephen Boyd (1931–1977) was a Northern-Irish actor.

Stephen Boyd may also refer to:

 Stephen Boyd (American football) (born 1972), American football linebacker
 Stephen Boyd (attorney) (born 1979), American public official and attorney
 Stephen Boyd (legislator), New Hampshire state legislator
 Stephen P. Boyd, American professor and control theorist
 Stephen Boyd (athlete) in 1993 IAAF World Cross Country Championships – Senior men's race
 Steve Boyd on List of P-Funk members
 Steven Boyd (born 1997), Scottish footballer
 Stephen William Boyd, professor of tourism at the University of Ulster, Northern Ireland